The 1918 Campeonato Carioca, the thirteenth edition of that championship, kicked off on April 14, 1918 and ended on January 5, 1919. It was organized by LMDT (Liga Metropolitana de Desportos Terrestres, or Metropolitan Land Sports League). Ten teams participated. Fluminense won the title for the 7th time. No teams were relegated.

Participating teams

System 
The tournament would be disputed in a double round-robin format, with the team with the most points winning the title. The team with the fewest points would dispute a playoff against the champions of the second level.

Championship

Second-place playoffs 
The regulation also stipulated that the runners-up of the championship would also receive a trophy. Since São Cristóvão and Botafogo tied in points for that position, they had to dispute a playoff.

Relegation playoffs 
The last-placed team, Mangueira, would dispute a playoff against Americano, champions of the Second Level. Mangueira won the playoff.

References 

Campeonato Carioca seasons
Carioca